Kiillinnguyaq, formerly the Kent Peninsula, is a large Arctic peninsula, almost totally surrounded by water, in the Kitikmeot Region of Nunavut. Were it not for a  isthmus at the southeast corner it would be a long island parallel to the coast. From the isthmus it extends  westward into the Coronation Gulf. To the south, Melville Sound separates it from the mainland. To the north is Dease Strait and then Victoria Island. To the west is Coronation Gulf and to the east, Queen Maud Gulf. Cape Flinders marks the western tip of the peninsula, Cape Franklin is at the northwestern point, and Hiiqtinniq, formerly Cape Alexander marks the northeastern point.

Historically, the Umingmuktogmiut subgroup of the Copper Inuit had a permanent community at Umingmuktog on the peninsula's western coast. In 1821, John Franklin reached the point from the west, at the most northerly point of the disastrous Coppermine expedition and then turned back. In 1839, the coast was clear of ice and Simpson followed the entire coast eastward.

References

Peninsulas of Kitikmeot Region
Hudson's Bay Company trading posts in Nunavut
Former populated places in the Kitikmeot Region